Duan Jansen (born 1 May 2000) is a South African cricketer. He made his first-class debut for North West in the 2018–19 CSA 3-Day Provincial Cup on 10 January 2019. He made his List A debut for North West in the 2018–19 CSA Provincial One-Day Challenge on 20 January 2019.

In September 2019, he was named in Free State's squad for the 2019–20 CSA Provincial T20 Cup. He made his Twenty20 debut for Free State in the 2019–20 CSA Provincial T20 Cup on 13 September 2019. In April 2021, he was named in North West's squad, ahead of the 2021–22 cricket season in South Africa.

Duan's twin brother, Marco, also played cricket for North West and currently plays for the South Africa national cricket team. Duan is part of the 2022 St Kitts & Nevis Patriots team competing in the 6ixty tournament and CPL. During the 6ixty tournament, he finished as one of the leading bowlers and helped his team win the tournament.

References

External links
 

2000 births
Living people
South African cricketers
North West cricketers
People from Klerksdorp